The Rambouillet Decree was a decree made by Napoleon Bonaparte in retaliation to the Nonintercourse Act. It stated that any American ship that entered a French port was subject to confiscation.

References

Decrees
Napoleon